Ariel Schlesinger (born 1980, Jerusalem) is an artist who lives and works in Berlin and Mexico City. His diverse body of work navigates sculpture, conceptual art, and installation art. Schlesinger’s installations often dislocate everyday objects, rearranging them in ways that leave viewers simultaneously amused and apprehensive. In 2017, Schlesinger won an international competition to design a public work for the entrance of the newly renovated Jewish Museum in Frankfurt.

Life and work

Between 1999 and 2003, Schlesinger studied at the Bezalel Academy of Art and Design in Jerusalem and the School of Visual Arts in New York City. Since moving to Berlin shortly after his graduation, he’s been awarded residencies in Germany, France, Italy and Japan. In 2012, Schlesinger was named “VHV-Artist of the Year,” earning a €25,000 prize from the German insurance and reinsurance company VHV Group. The work for which he won the prize, A Car Full of Gas, has been exhibited in Berlin and across Europe.

His installations, sometimes deemed “space-interventions”, consist of ordinary objects, including cars, gas tanks, bikes, lighters, pencils, paper and socks, which are arranged in ways that both de-familiarize their everyday meaning and generate unexpected, humorous, and sinister associations. In his work A Car Full of Gas, for example, it is not human passengers that sit in the front seats of a vintage mini car, but rather two, 60-litre gas canisters, inevitably anthropomorphized given their context. From one of the car windows, a small flame burns. The clean, everyday elegance of the work has been read as an omen of catastrophe. Perhaps nobody has been as precise as Gal Katz in capturing a key motive of Schlesinger’s work: the tension between the order of perfectly immaculate objects and arrangements, on the one hand, and a poignant sense of looming calamity, on the other.

In 2017, Schlesinger won an international competition to design a large-scale public work for the newly renovated Jewish Museum of Frankfurt. The proposal consists of an 11-meter tall sculpture composed of two trees whose branches are connected such that the roots of one tree point to the sky, while the other is firmly rooted in the ground. The estimated cost of producing and installing the work, largely financed by the Rothschild family, is €350,000.

Selected exhibitions

Alongside many group exhibitions, Schlesinger has had a large number of solo shows since his graduation in 2003—in Israel, Italy, Germany, Belgium, Switzerland, Slovenia and France.

 2003: Herzliya Museum of Contemporary Art
 2005, 2009, 2013, 2014 and 2016: Dvir Gallery, Tel Aviv
 2007: Galleria Klerkx, Milan
 2008: 2010 and 2014: Galerija Gregor Podnar, Berlin and Ljublijana
 2011: Musée du Chateau de Montbeliard, Montbeliard; Kunstverein, Braunschweig
 2012: Yvon Lambert, Paris; Sint-Lukasgalerie, Brussels; Künstlerhaus, Bremen
 2014: Kunsthaus Baselland, Muttenz
 2015: Galleria Massimo Minini, Brescia

References

External links
 Schlesinger in ART SY

1980 births
Israeli artists
Living people
Israeli expatriates in Germany
Israeli expatriates in Mexico